Plataea californiaria is a species of geometrid moth in the family Geometridae. It was described by Gottlieb August Wilhelm Herrich-Schäffer in 1856 and is found in North America.

The MONA or Hodges number for Plataea californiaria is 6924.

References

 Ferris C. (2010). "A revision of the genus Antepione Packard with description of the new genus Pionenta Ferris (Lepidoptera, Geometridae, Ennominae)". ZooKeys. 71: 49-70.
 Scoble, Malcolm J. ed. (1999). Geometrid Moths of the World: A Catalogue (Lepidoptera, Geometridae). 1016.

Further reading

 Arnett, Ross H. (2000). American Insects: A Handbook of the Insects of America North of Mexico. CRC Press.

Ourapterygini